The Battle of Sans Culottes Camp (5 February 1794) saw a Spanish army commanded by José de Urrutia y de las Casas attack part of the French Army of the Western Pyrenees under Jean-Henri-Guy-Nicolas de Frégeville. The Spanish assault seized two key positions behind the Bidasoa River but was unable to overrun the main position, called Sans Culottes Camp after an eight-hour contest. The War of the Pyrenees action was fought at a location described as being "in front" of (that is, west of) Saint-Jean-de-Luz near the modern border between Spain and France.

Ventura Caro y Fontes had 20,000 troops in the Spanish Army of the West Pyrenees. He ordered his left wing near Irun and center in the Baztan Valley to attack the French camps behind the Bidasoa. French army artillery chief Augustin de Lespinasse gave up the outlying fortifications in order to concentrate his strength in the main camp. By the time Frégeville arrived on the scene, the Spanish attack had lost its momentum. Bon-Adrien Jeannot de Moncey, later a Marshal of France under Napoleon, was promoted to general of brigade for his distinguished actions during the battle.

References

Conflicts in 1794
Battles of the French Revolutionary Wars
Battles of the War of the First Coalition
Battles involving Spain
Battles involving France
Battles in Nouvelle-Aquitaine
History of Pyrénées-Atlantiques
1794 in France